Mona Township is one of twelve townships in Ford County, Illinois, USA.  As of the 2010 census, its population was 334 and it contained 152 housing units.  The township was formed as Delhi Township from a portion of Rogers Township on March 2, 1870; its name was changed to Mona Township on June 16, 1870.

Geography

Cities, towns, villages
 Kempton (south three-quarters)

Cemeteries
The township contains Mona Township Cemetery.

Major highways
  Illinois Route 115
  Illinois Route 116

Demographics

School districts
 Tri Point Community Unit School District 6-J

Political districts
 Illinois' 15th congressional district
 State House District 105
 State Senate District 53

References
 
 United States Census Bureau 2007 TIGER/Line Shapefiles
 United States National Atlas

External links
 City-Data.com
 Illinois State Archives

Townships in Ford County, Illinois
Townships in Illinois